Cultural conservatism is described as the protection of the cultural heritage of a nation state, or of a culture not defined by state boundaries. It is usually associated with criticism of multiculturalism, and opposition to immigration. Cultural conservatism is sometimes concerned with the preservation of a language, such as French in Quebec, and other times with the preservation of an ethnic group's culture such as Native Americans.

In the United States, cultural conservatism may imply a conservative position in the culture wars. Because cultural conservatism (according to the compass theory) expresses the social dimension of conservatism, it is sometimes referred to as social conservatism. However, social conservatism describes conservative moral and social values or stances on socio-cultural issues such as abortion and same-sex marriage in opposition to cultural liberalism (in USA, social liberalism). Nationalism, meanwhile, also differs from cultural conservatism as it does not always develop in a particular culture.

Arguments

In favor 

Proponents argue that cultural conservatism preserves the cultural identity of a country. They often promote assimilation into the dominant culture, believing that monoculturalism is more constructive to national unity. They claim that assimilation facilitates the integration of immigrants and ethnic minorities into broader society, framing cultural conservatism as a solution to ethnic strife. Researchers note that the more culturally homogeneous a community is, the more people trust each other. Trust was shown to decrease in more culturally diverse areas.

Proponents of cultural conservatism have criticized multiculturalism, believing that cultural pluralism is detrimental to a unified national identity. They argue that cultural diversity only serves to marginalize immigrants by othering them as outsiders in society. In some countries multiculturalism is believed to create de facto racial segregation in the form of ethnic enclaves. Opposition to immigration is also a common stance among proponents. Immigrants often bring the cultures, religions, and languages of their home countries with them, sometimes influencing and changing the cultures of their host countries. Proponents of cultural conservatism argue that some of these imported cultural practices, such as hijabs, polygamy, child marriage, and female genital mutilation, are in direct conflict with the values of the dominant culture.

Against 

Opponents argue that cultural conservatism is detrimental to cultural diversity. They criticize cultural conservatism for promoting cultural intolerance, creating narrow ethnocentric mindsets, and stifling self-expression. Opponents cite numerous historical atrocities that originated from extreme forms of cultural conservatism, such as racism, genocide, ethnic cleansing, colonialism, and racial segregation. They claim that cultural assimilation leads to the marginalization of minorities who do not conform to the dominant culture.

Opponents have supported multiculturalism, believing it creates a more diverse and tolerant society. They claim it helps people of the ethnic majority to learn more about other cultures, adapt better to social change, and be more tolerant of diversity. They also believe multiculturalism brings more attention to the historical accomplishments of other ethnic groups, which had been neglected in past times. Support for immigration is also a common stance among opponents of cultural conservatism, who argue that it enriches society by contributing diverse new ideas. In some cases the art, music, food, or clothing of the immigrants are adopted by the dominant culture.

By country

Australia
In 2006 the Australian Government proposed to introduce a compulsory citizenship test which would assess English skills and knowledge of Australian values. This sparked a debate over cultural conservatism in Australia. Andrew Robb told a conference that some Australians worried that interest groups had transformed multiculturalism into a philosophy that put "allegiances to original culture ahead of national loyalty, a philosophy which fosters separate development, a federation of ethnic cultures, not one community."

The One Nation Party is a conservative political party that opposes multiculturalism, calling it "a threat to the very basis of the Australian culture, identity and shared values."

Canada

Unlike the United States, Canada has always been a culturally divided country, though to varying degrees. Since the premiership of Pierre Trudeau, Canadian identity has been viewed as a cultural mosaic. Trudeau Sr. once stated that there is "no such thing as a model or ideal Canadian," and that to desire one is a "disastrous" pursuit. His son Justin Trudeau, likewise Prime Minister, has continued to spread this spirit in declaring Canada "the first post-national state" due to its lack of a core identity and mainstream. The fifth wave of immigration to Canada which followed Trudeau Sr.'s premiership and continues to this day is the largest manifestation of this change. For example, the city of Richmond, British Columbia is majority Chinese, and nearly half of Torontonians are foreign-born, the city which now bears the motto "Diversity Our Strength." Canadian cultural conservatism as a reaction to the multiculturalism of Pierre Trudeau (and subsequently of Brian Mulroney) reached its peak with the Reform Party and waned over time. Its decline has been marked by the electoral failure of the People's Party of Canada, which formed partly as a response to the Conservative Party's perceived weakness on the issue.

Quebec

Quebec is unique in Canada for its cultural conservatism. Though not a socially conservative province, nor religiously conservative (not since the aftermath of the Grande Noirceur), Quebecois culture has always maintained a certain suspicion and reluctance towards unity with the rest of Canada. Language protectionism (reflected in laws such as Bill 101) is a central concern of Quebec cultural conservatives. Quebec has held two referendums on separation and has never ratified the Constitution Act of 1982. The Bloc Québécois formed in reaction to the Mulroney premiership (like the Reform Party) to advocate for Quebecois interests in the federal parliament. It once held the office of Official Opposition, which was followed by a decline, but the party has seen a surge in popularity as of late, currently holding 32 of Quebec's 78 seats in the House of Commons.

China
Central to the ideas of the Cultural Revolution was the elimination of the Four Olds, which were elements of Chinese culture that at the time were seen to oppose the goals of Communism in China. However, the Chinese Communist Party (CCP) at the time protected some of the most important Chinese historical monuments, including some archaeological discoveries such as the Terracotta Army. CCP general secretary Xi Jinping  has overseen a revival in popularity of historical Chinese cultural figures such as Confucius and has placed more emphasis on the value of Chinese culture than his predecessors. He also includes culture in his "comprehensive" political goals.

France
French political theorist Alain de Benoist argues that democracy itself must inherently be a government of a national culture, and that liberal pluralism is therefore not democratic.

Germany
In Germany, parallel societies established by some immigrant communities have been criticized by cultural conservatives, giving rise to the concept of the Leitkultur. Conservative Chancellor Angela Merkel of the Christian Democratic Union described attempts to build a multicultural German society to have "failed, utterly failed". Many Germans have expressed alarm over the large number of Muslim immigrants in their country, many of whom have failed to integrate into German society.

Italy
Italy is a very culturally conservative society. Recent surveys show that the vast majority of Italians want fewer immigrants to be allowed into the country, while few want to keep the current level or increase immigration.

Japan
Japan has been a culturally conservative society. Being monocultural, it has traditionally refused to recognize ethnic differences in Japan. Taro Aso has called Japan a "one race" nation.

Netherlands
Paul Cliteur attacked multiculturalism, political correctness, cultural relativism, and non-Western cultural values. He argued that cultural relativism would lead to acceptance of outdated practices brought to the Western World by immigrants such as sexism, homophobia, and antisemitism.

Paul Scheffer believes that cultural conservatism and integration are necessary for a society, but the presence of immigrants undermines this. He cites failure to assimilate, de facto segregation, unemployment, crime, and Muslim opposition to secularism as the main problems resulting from immigration.

Russia
In Russia, Russian culture has been defended by cultural conservatives on the grounds that the destruction of traditional values is undemocratic.

United Kingdom
In the 20th century, immigration to the United Kingdom gave rise to multicultural policies. However, ever since the beginning of the 21st century, the UK government has moved towards cultural conservatism and the assimilation of minority communities. Opposition has grown to multicultural government policies, with some viewing it as a costly failure. After the 7 July 2005 London bombings, Conservative David Davis called such policies "outdated".

Ed West argues that the British establishment had blindly embraced multiculturalism without proper consideration of the downsides of ethnic diversity. According to cultural conservatives, while minority cultures are allowed to remain distinct, traditional British culture is abhorred for being exclusive and adapts to accommodate minorities, often without the consent of the local population.

United States

A prominent criticism by cultural conservatives in the United States is that multiculturalism undermines national unity, hinders social integration, and leads to the fragmentation of society. Samuel P. Huntington described multiculturalism as an anti-Western ideology that attacked the United States' inclusion in Western civilization, denied the existence of a common American culture, and promoted ethnic identities over national ones.

Discussions to do with the conservation of American culture often involve definitional disputes. Some consider the United States as a nation of immigrants or "melting pot," others (such as David Hackett Fischer) argue that British immigrant cultures are responsible for the development of modern American culture and values. American cultural conservatives often claim that the culture is at risk due primarily to demographic change from immigration, as well as the influence of academia, which has produced increasingly left-wing alumni over time. Dinesh D'Souza argues that multiculturalism in American universities undermines the moral universalism that education once stood for. In particular, he criticized the growth of ethnic studies programs.

List of cultural conservative political parties

Australia
 Australia First Party
 Australian Defence League
 Australian Protectionist Party
 Pauline Hanson's One Nation

Bulgaria
 Bulgarian National Union – New Democracy

Canada
 Canadian Nationalist Party
 People's Party of Canada

Czech Republic
 Freedom and Direct Democracy

Denmark
 Danish People's Party

Estonia
 Conservative People's Party of Estonia

Finland
 Blue and White Front
 Power Belongs to the People

France
 Blue, White and Red Rally
 National Rally
 Reconquête

Greece
 Greek Solution
 Greeks for the Fatherland
 LEPEN
 National Popular Consciousness

Hungary
 Fidesz
 Our Homeland Movement

Italy
 Lega Nord
 Lega per Salvini Premier

Netherlands
 Forum for Democracy
 Party for Freedom

New Zealand
 New Zealand First

Poland
 Law and Justice

Portugal
 CDS-PP
 Chega
 Ergue-te

Romania
 Alliance for the Union of Romanians
 People's Movement Party
 Romanian Nationhood Party

Serbia
 Serbian Party Oathkeepers

South Korea
 Dawn of Liberty Party

Spain
 Vox

Sweden
 Alternative for Sweden
 Sweden Democrats

United States
 Constitution Party
 Republican Party

See also 

 Criticism of multiculturalism
 Cultural appropriation
 Cultural nationalism
 Paleoconservatism
 Paleolibertarianism
 Social conservatism
 Traditionalist conservatism

Notes

Further reading 
 John J. Langdale III (2012). Superfluous Southerners: Cultural Conservatism and the South, 1920–1990. Columbia, Missouri: University of Missouri Press.

Conservatism
Conservatism in the United States
Right-wing ideologies
Political terminology

fi:Arvokonservatismi